Currabenya, New South Wales is a remote rural locality and civil Parish, of  Thoulcanna County, a cadasteral division of New South Wales.

Geography
The topography is the flat and arid with a Köppen climate classification of Bwh (Desert).

The economy in the parish is based on broad acre agriculture, mainly Cattle, and there are no towns in the parish and the nearest settlement is Hungerford, Queensland and Wanaaring, New South Wales, with Tibooburra, New South Wales to the west. 
The Queensland and New South Wales Border runs along the northern boundary of the parish.

History
The parish is on the traditional land of the Bardadji people, and in the 1890s was included in the Albert Gold Fields.

References

Localities in New South Wales
Geography of New South Wales
Populated places in New South Wales
Far West (New South Wales)